Double Fork Branch is a  long second-order tributary to Marshyhope Creek in Sussex County, Delaware.

Course
Double Fork Branch rises on the Cart Branch divide about 1-mile west-northwest of Greenwood, Delaware, and then flows generally west-southwest to join Marshyhope Creek about 0.5 miles north of Woodenhawk, Delaware.

Watershed
Double Fork Branch drains  of area, receives about 45.0 in/year of precipitation, and is about 12.2% forested.

See also
List of rivers of Delaware

References

Rivers of Delaware
Rivers of Sussex County, Delaware